The Vernon District Schoolhouse No. 4 is a historic school building at 4201 Fort Bridgman Road (Vermont Route 142) in Vernon, Vermont.  Built 1848, it is a well-preserved mid-19th century brick district school, which now serves as a local historical museum.  It was listed on the National Register of Historic Places in 2005.

Description and history
The Vernon District Schoolhouse No. 4 is located in rural southern Vernon, on the east side of Fort Bridgman Road, just south of its junction with Pond Road.  It is set on a lot overlooking the Connecticut River, which flows just to the east.  It is a single story brick structure, with a gabled roof and brick foundation.  The street-facing facade is three bays wide, each occupied by a sash window.  The south facade has a bank of six sash windows, while the north side has none.  A wood-frame addition extends to the rear, with the main entrance in its southern facade, sheltered by a shed-roofed hood.  Decorative detailing includes a band of corbeled brickwork in the cornices.

The main brick block of the school was built in 1848.  One portion of the wood-frame addition was added in 1924, at which time the school's interior was probably also remodeled, to bring the building in line with new state standards.  The addition was enlarged in 1941, adding inside chemical toilets to the building, again in response to new state requirements for indoor bathroom facilities.  The school remained in use until 1954, when the town consolidated its districts into a single elementary school.  The school sat vacant until 1972, when it was adapted for use as a local history museum by Vernon Historians, the local historical society.  It is one of three surviving district school buildings in the town.

See also
National Register of Historic Places listings in Windham County, Vermont

References

School buildings on the National Register of Historic Places in Vermont
Greek Revival architecture in Vermont
Buildings and structures completed in 1848
Buildings and structures in Vernon, Vermont
Museums in Windham County, Vermont
National Register of Historic Places in Windham County, Vermont